Amber Nicole Holcomb (born March 17, 1994) is an American singer, who came in fourth place on the twelfth season of American Idol.

Early life
Amber Nicole Holcomb was born on March 17, 1994, in Houston, Texas. Holcomb starting singing at the age of two in her church. She graduated from Dekaney High School in 2012.

American Idol

Overview
Holcomb previously auditioned for American Idol in the eleventh season, but was cut in the Las Vegas round, where she was grouped with Curtis Finch Jr., Shannon Magrane and Joshua Ledet.

She performed "My Funny Valentine" in Vegas sudden death rounds which received standing ovation from the judges. Holcomb performed "I Believe in You and Me" at the semi-final voting round receiving standing ovation from all of the judges. In the semifinals of the twelfth season, Holcomb performed  "My Funny Valentine" by Lorenz Hart and "Just Give Me a Reason" by Pink. She was then eliminated on May 2, 2013, coming in fourth place. She performed "I Believe in You and Me" as her goodbye song.

Performances and results

 When Ryan Seacrest announced the results for this particular night, Holcomb was among the bottom three contestants, but was declared safe when Paul Jolley was eliminated.
 When Ryan Seacrest announced the results for this particular night, Holcomb was in the bottom two, but was declared safe when Lazaro Arbos was eliminated.
 When Ryan Seacrest announced the results for this particular night, Holcomb was in the bottom two with Candice Glover, but was declared safe as no one was eliminated.
 Due to the surprise non-elimination at the top 4, the top 4 remained intact for another week.

Post-Idol
Amber Holcomb took part in the American Idols LIVE! Tour 2013 from July 19 through August 31, 2013. On August 4, 2013, news surfaced that Holcomb and her boyfriend, Lamar Denson, are expecting their first child. On February 14, 2014, Holcomb gave birth to a baby girl.

On April 7, 2016, Holcomb and Ruben Studdard sang "Here, There and Everywhere" on fifteenth season finale of American Idol.

Personal life
On February 14, 2014, Holcomb gave birth to a baby girl. Her boyfriend, Lamber D. Denson, is reportedly the father of the baby.

References

External links
 Amber Holcomb on American Idol
 

American Idol participants
1994 births
21st-century American singers
Living people
Singers from Texas
21st-century African-American women singers
American contemporary R&B singers
People from Shepherd, Texas
21st-century American women singers